Elfs is a role-playing game published by Adept Press in 2001.

Description
Elfs is a role-playing game where the players take on the role of sleazy and dim-witted elves that like to loot and kill.

Publication history
Ron Edwards created Adept Press, through which he published his second RPG, Elfs (2001) as a PDF.

Reception

References

Adept Press games
Indie role-playing games
Role-playing games introduced in 2001